T'aqachiri (Aymara, also spelled Tacachiri) is a mountain in the Chilla-Kimsa Chata mountain range in the Andes of Bolivia which reaches a height of approximately . It is located in the La Paz Department, Ingavi Province, Jesús de Machaca Municipality.

References 

Mountains of La Paz Department (Bolivia)